Jean Noël Desmarais (April 11, 1924 – July 25, 1995) was a Canadian physician, radiologist, and politician.

Born in Sudbury, Ontario, the brother of Louis Desmarais and Paul Desmarais, he was not involved in politics before being appointed to the Senate of Canada, when he represented the senatorial division of Sudbury, Ontario in 1993.

The Jean-Noël Desmarais Pavilion, designed by the architect Moshe Safdie, in the Montreal Museum of Fine Arts is named in his father's honour.

A cigarette smoker, he died of cancer in 1995.

References
 
 

1924 births
1995 deaths
Canadian senators from Ontario
Politicians from Greater Sudbury
Progressive Conservative Party of Canada senators
Franco-Ontarian people